Juliano Rangel de Andrade (born April 4, 1982 in Alfredo Chaves) is a Brazilian football defender, who plays for Primera División club Sanarate.

Club career
Rangel played for lower league sides in his native Brazil and in Mexico before joining Salvadoran side Deportes Savio in 2007. He then also played for Alianza and LA Firpo before crossing borders again to join Marquense.

Career statistics

Club

External links
  
 Juliano de Andrade at BDFA.com.ar 

1982 births
Living people
Sportspeople from Espírito Santo
Brazilian footballers
Brazilian expatriate footballers
Fluminense FC players
Deportes Savio players
Alianza F.C. footballers
C.D. Luis Ángel Firpo footballers
Deportivo Marquense players
Liga Nacional de Fútbol Profesional de Honduras players
Expatriate footballers in Mexico
Expatriate footballers in Honduras
Expatriate footballers in El Salvador
Expatriate footballers in Guatemala
Association football defenders